Atlas Werke was a German shipbuilding company, located in Bremen. It was founded in 1911.

After the war, Atlas Werke also started to make echo sounders and other nautical instruments. In 1948, Ludolf Jenckel set up a division to produce mass spectrometers, the Mess- und Analysen Technik (MAT) division. The company in Bremen was then sold to Finnigan in 1981 to form the Finnigan MAT brand which was acquired by Thermo Electron (becoming Thermo Fisher Scientific in 2006).

In 1964 Krupp acquired a majority shareholding in Atlas Werke and the electronics division was spun off as the independent company Atlas Elektronik in Bremen-Sebaldsbrück. All shipbuilding was ceased in 1969.

See also
 Atlas GmbH

References

External links
 rheinmetall.de webpage with details about Atlas Werke
 

Shipbuilding companies of Germany
Manufacturing companies established in 1911
Defunct companies of Germany
Manufacturing companies based in Bremen (state)
Companies based in Bremen
History of Bremen (city)
Manufacturing companies disestablished in 1969
1969 disestablishments in West Germany
German companies established in 1911